The year 632 BC was a year of the pre-Julian Roman calendar. In the Roman Empire, it was known as year 122 Ab urbe condita . The denomination 632 BC for this year has been used since the early medieval period, when the Anno Domini calendar era became the prevalent method in Europe for naming years.

Events
Cylon, Athenian nobleman, seizes the Acropolis in a failed attempt to become king.

Births
 Suizei, emperor of Japan (d. 549 BC)
 Jehoahaz, king of Judah (approximate date)

Deaths
 Cheng Dechen, Chinese prime minister of Chu
 Cylon, Athenian nobleman and usurper

References